Yoshihiko Isozaki (born September 8, 1957, in Kagawa Prefecture, Japan) is a Japanese politician who has served as a member of the House of Councillors of Japan since 2010. He represents the Kagawa at-large district and is a member of the Liberal Democratic Party.

He is a member of the following committees in the House of Councillors:

 Committee on Judicial Affairs (director)
 Committee on Budget
 Special Committee on North Korean Abduction Issue and Related Matters
 Commission on the Constitution
 Board of Oversight and Review of Specially Designated Secrets

References 

Living people
1957 births
Politicians from Kagawa Prefecture
21st-century Japanese politicians
Members of the House of Councillors (Japan)
Liberal Democratic Party (Japan) politicians
University of Tokyo alumni